Alejandra Evangelina Herrera Reyes (born 9 October 1992) is a Salvadoran footballer who plays as a midfielder. She has been a member of the El Salvador women's national team.

International goals
Scores and results list El Salvador's goal tally first.

See also
List of El Salvador women's international footballers

References

1992 births
Living people
Women's association football midfielders
Salvadoran women's footballers
Sportspeople from San Salvador
El Salvador women's international footballers
Club Atlético River Plate (women) players
Alianza F.C. footballers
Salvadoran expatriate footballers
Salvadoran expatriates in Argentina
Expatriate women's footballers in Argentina